Donggo (，pinyin:Dong'e) was a clan of Manchu nobility belonging to the Manchu Plain White Banner, one of the 3 upper banners of Eight Banner system. Several lineages were members of Manchu Plain Red Banner.

Donggo Hala was a branch of Irgen Gioro clan. The ancestral home of the Donggo Hala was located in Liaodong. After the demise of Qing dynasty, their descendants changed their surnames to Dong (董),Zhao (赵) and other.

Notable figures

Males 

 Hohori (何和礼; 1561–1624, pinyin: heheli) one of 5 founders of Later Jin dynasty and duke Yongqin (勇勤公, meaning "brave and diligent") 
 Dulei (杜雷), a first rank military official (都统, pinyin: dutong) and held a title of second class count (二等伯)
 Dojili (多济理), a second rank military official (副都统, pinyin: fudutong)
 Kajihai (喀济海), a head censor (长史)
 Yaxing'a (雅星阿), served a third rank military official (参领)
 Xindali (新达理)
 Xihan (席汉)
 Eshuo (鄂碩/鄂硕; d. 1657), served as a first rank military official, Grand Minister of Internal Affairs(內大臣)
 Feiyanggu (费扬古, 1645-1701), participant of early Qing military campaigns, including fight against Revolt of the Three Feudatories, Battle of Ulan Butung, general of Xi'an and Shaanxi
 Badu (巴度), held a title of master commandant of light chariot (轻车都尉)
 Pengchun (彭春;d. 1699), an ambassador to Torghuts and signator of the Treaty of Nerchinsk.
 Tiebao (铁保), renowned Qianlong era artisan and painter, friend of Yongxing

 Prince Consorts

Females 
Imperial Consort
 Empress
 Empress Xiaoxian (1639–1660), the Shunzhi Emperor's imperial noble consort, the mother of Prince Rong (1657–1658)

 Consort
 Consort Zhen (d. 1661), the Shunzhi Emperor's concubine
 Consort Ningque (d. 1694), the Shunzhi Emperor's concubine, the mother of Fuquan (1653–1703)

Princess Consort
 Primary Consort
 Yunzhi's primary consort, the mother of Hongqing (1696–1701), Hongsheng (1698–1732), first daughter (1700–1701) and Princess (1701–1753)
 Yuntang's primary consort, the mother of fourth daughter (1705 – 1726 or 1727)
 Hongshi's primary consort (1703–1775), the mother of first daughter (1722–1727)

 Concubine
 Šurhaci's concubine, the mother of fifth daughter (b. 1593)

Gallery

References 

Manchu clans
Plain White Banner
Plain Red Banner